Global Foundation for Democracy and Development (GFDD) is a non-profit, non-partisan organization dedicated to promoting collaboration between organizations in the United States and the Dominican Republic.
Global Foundation for Democracy and Development (GFDD) is a sister institution of Fundación Global Democracia y Desarrollo (FUNGLODE). It was created in 2002 by Dr. Leonel Fernández, at the end of his first term as Head of State.

Locations
GFDD has offices in Washington, D.C., New York City and Santo Domingo.

International friendship associations
Organizations based in the Dominican Republic